The Egyptian Front is an alliance of political parties contesting the 2015 Egyptian parliamentary election in a joint list with the Independent Current Coalition, called Egypt.

The alliance was established on 17 August 2014.

Former presidential candidate Hamdeen Sabahi has criticized the alliance by stating that it represents "Mubarak-era politics". The Modern Egypt Party withdrew from the coalition. The Tagammu Party is not part of the coalition. The Egyptian Patriotic Movement and the My Homeland Egypt Party left the alliance and joined the For the Love of Egypt coalition following a failed attempt to merge the For the Love of Egypt coalition and the Egyptian Front. Both of the parties are no longer part of that alliance and instead joined the Egypt alliance.

Affiliated parties
Republican People's Party
National Party of Egypt
Egyptian Liberation Party
Egyptian Patriotic Movement
My Homeland Egypt Party
Democratic Generation Party
Tomorrow Party

References

2014 establishments in Egypt
Political party alliances in Egypt
Organizations established in 2014